The 2005 FIBA Asia Championship qualification was held in late 2004 and early 2005 with the Gulf region, West Asia, Southeast Asia, East Asia and Middle Asia (Central Asia and South Asia) each conducting tournaments.

Qualification format
The following are eligible to participate:

 The organizing country.
 The champion team from the previous FIBA Asia Stanković Cup.
 The four best-placed teams from the previous FIBA Asia Stanković Cup will qualify the same number of teams from their respective sub-zones.
 The two best teams from the sub-zones.

FIBA Asia Stanković Cup

Qualified teams

East Asia
The 2005 East Asia Basketball Championship  is the qualifying tournament for the 2005 FIBA Asia Championship. the four best teams excluding Korea qualifies for 2005 FIBA Asia Championship. The tournament was held at Yangjiang, China.

Gulf

The 2004 Gulf Basketball Association Championship is the qualifying tournament for the 2005 FIBA Asia Championship. the two best teams excluding Qatar qualifies for 2005 FIBA Asia Championship. The tournament was held at Dammam, Saudi Arabia.

Middle Asia
The 2005 Middle Asia Basketball Championship  is the qualifying tournament for the 2005 FIBA Asia Championship. the three best teams qualifies for 2005 FIBA Asia Championship. The tournament was held at New Delhi, India.

Southeast Asia

The 6th Southeast Asia Basketball Association Championship is the qualifying tournament for the 2005 FIBA Asia Championship. the two best teams qualifies for 2005 FIBA Asia Championship. The tournament was held at Kuala Lumpur, Malaysia.

West Asia
The 2005 West Asia Basketball Association Championship  is the qualifying tournament for the 2005 FIBA Asia Championship. the three best teams qualifies for 2005 FIBA Asia Championship. The tournament was held at Beirut, Lebanon.

References

External links
FIBA Asia official website 
East Asia Qualification Tournament
West Asia Qualification Tournament
Gulf Qualification Tournament

2005
qualification
qualification
SEABA Championship
West Asian Basketball Championship